was a town located in Kurate District, Fukuoka Prefecture, Japan.

As of 2003, the town had an estimated population of 9,889 and a density of 113.02 persons per km². The total area was 87.50 km².

On February 11, 2006, Wakamiya, along with the town of Miyata (also from Kurate District), was merged to create the city of Miyawaka.

External links
 Miyawaka official website 

Dissolved municipalities of Fukuoka Prefecture
Populated places disestablished in 2006
2006 disestablishments in Japan